Ian Fishback (January 19, 1979 – November 19, 2021) was a United States Army officer, who became known after he sent a letter to Senator John McCain of Arizona on September 16, 2005, in which Fishback stated his concerns about the continued abuse of prisoners held under the auspices of the Global War on Terror.

After receipt of his letter, McCain, along with Republican Senators John Warner and Lindsey Graham, wrote an amendment to a Senate bill that would make illegal previous Bush administration claims for the use of extreme methods of abuse.

Early life
Fishback was born in Detroit on January 19, 1979. He was a 1997 graduate of Newberry High School in Newberry, Michigan, where he played on a football team.

He was admitted to West Point and earned a bachelor of science degree in middle eastern studies in 2001. In May 2012, Fishback was awarded a master’s degree in philosophy and political science at the University of Michigan, writing his master thesis on just war theory. He received a Ph.D. in philosophy from the University of Michigan in 2021.

Military service
Fishback served in the United States Army and achieved the rank of major in the United States Army Special Forces. 

He served four combat tours in the U.S. Army, two with the 82nd Airborne and two with the Fifth Special Forces Group.

Fishback retired from the Army in 2014.

Teaching and research

From 2012 to 2015, Fishback served as an instructor at West Point, where he built good rapport with cadets. He collaborated with Jeff McMahan to create a joint philosophy seminar for West Point cadets and Rutgers philosophy students in 2013.

He became a Ph.D. student in philosophy at the University of Michigan, Ann Arbor researching the interplay of morality and law regarding relative proportionality and necessity. In 2021, Fishback submitted his Ph.D. dissertation that was entitled, Method and the Morality of War (adviser Elizabeth S. Anderson).

As an interdisciplinary scholar exploring the moral foundations of obedience to orders and command responsibility in unconventional warfare contexts, he presented and participated in discussion panels on the intersection of national security and human rights, obedience to orders and the structure of the morality, appropriate use of military force, and strategic consequences of torture, among other topics.    

In 2020, the Fulbright U.S. Scholar Program awarded Fishback the Fulbright-Lund Distinguished Chair of Public International Law grant to lecture and conduct research in Lund, Sweden at the Raoul Wallenberg Institute of Human Rights and Humanitarian Law in January-October 2021.

Later life
He returned to Newberry from Sweden and according to his family struggled with depression. 

Ian Fishback died at a care facility in Bangor, Michigan, on November 19, 2021, aged 42.

His memorial service with around 100 people in attendance was held at American Legion Post #74 in Newberry, Michigan.

Letter to McCain
While stationed in Iraq, for more than a year Fishback expressed concerns to his immediate chain of command regarding treatment of detainees at Forward Operating Base Mercury in Fallujah District but was ignored.

In 2005 he decided to write a letter to McCain about what he perceived as a military culture that was permissive toward the abuse of prisoners. 

The letter resulted in the creation of a anti-torture legislation, the Detainee Treatment Act, "sponsored by Senator McCain and passed by the Senate in an overwhelming show of bipartisan support with a vote of 90-9."

Recognition
During debates over his amendment, Senator McCain said:

On May 8, 2006, Fishback was chosen by Time magazine as one of the 100 most influential people in the world for taking his stand against torture.

Matthew Harwood, an associate editor at Security Management magazine, wrote in Attitudes Aren't Free: Thinking Deeply About Diversity in the US Armed Forces (2012) that Fishback's letter to Senator McCain "is a testament that inside the US military lies redemption".

Andrew Bacevich stated that Major Fishback was a "uniformed whistleblower who took seriously the values of “duty, honor, and country” he had learned at West Point. A classic straight arrow, Ian found intolerable even the slightest deviation from what the soldierly code of conduct required."

Senator Dick Durbin called Ian Fishback a military hero:

See also

 Joe Darby
 Alberto J. Mora
 Philip D. Zelikow

References

External links

Letter to McCain - Washington Post full reprint

1979 births
2021 deaths
Military personnel from Detroit
United States Army officers
United States Military Academy alumni
United States Army personnel of the Iraq War
American whistleblowers
University of Michigan alumni
United States Army personnel of the War in Afghanistan (2001–2021)